Philip John Turner   (1876 – 13 August 1943) was an architect and educator from Stowmarket, Suffolk. After emigrating to Canada in 1906, he began a private architectural practice in Montreal, and in 1910 became a lecturer at the McGill School of Architecture, where he would teach for more than three decades. He became the director of the School in 1939 and opened the door to co-ed education while also fighting the threat of the School's closing due to low enrollment after the Great Depression and amidst World War II.

As an architect, Turner designed many types of buildings, including residences, churches, banks, libraries and commercial buildings. He served on the council of the Province of Quebec Association of Architects (PQAA) and became president in 1933. He received the Gold Medal of the PQAA in 1941. He also served on the council of the Royal Architectural Institute of Canada, where he represented the Royal Institute of British Architects. He was elected as a Fellow of the Royal Institute of British Architects and Senior Fellow of the Royal Architectural Institute of Canada.

Personal life and education
Philip Turner was born in Stowmarket, Suffolk in 1876 to a large family of many sisters and brothers. He attended Framlingham College in Suffolk for secondary education and the Architectural Association School of Architecture for post-secondary education. He articled to John Shewell Corder from 1892 to 1895 and was his assistant from 1895 to 1898. He was the assistant to Francis William Tasker in 1898, James Ransome from 1899 to 1900 and to Charles Barry Edward from 1901 to 1907. He passed his architectural exam in 1900. He married Adeline Peddar in June 1910. Turner passed away from a heart attack on August 13, 1943, two years after he retired from being director at McGill's School of Architecture.

Teaching career
Turner emigrated to Canada in 1906, and joined the McGill School of Architecture's faculty in 1910, where he first taught a lecture on Building Construction. He soon began to also teach Materials of Construction, Professional Practice and Specifications, and was appointed Professor in 1933. In addition to teaching at the School of Architecture, Turner was appointed Special Lecturer on Library Buildings in 1926 in the McGill Library School, which he continued to hold until after his retirement from the architecture school. In 1939, he succeeded Ramsay Traquair as the director of the School of Architecture, a position he held for only two years until 1941. During these two years, however, he accomplished a great deal at the School. Turner became director at a time when student enrollment was very low, in the wake of the Great Depression in Canada and the outbreak of World War II. Enrollment was so low that the Principal of McGill at the time, Lewis Williams Douglas considered phasing out architectural education at McGill. As director, Turner, along with his Executive Secretary, John Bland, fought the threat of the School's closing and gathered the support of several distinguished architects in Montreal, ultimately convincing the Principal not to close the School. He created an advisory committee on the School of Architecture in 1939, with E.I. Barott, Harold Lea Fetherstonhaugh and J.C. McDougal representing the profession, and he and Percy Nobbs representing the School.

Turner also opened the door to co-ed education at the School of Architecture, which had not yet been done at any department within the Faculty of Engineering at McGill. In 1943, two years after Turner retired as director, Catherine Mary Wisnicki became the School's first female graduate and the first female graduate from the Faculty of Engineering.

Philip Turner's health was quite frail by the time he became director of the School, and in the following year it had deteriorated so much that he entrusted the directorship to his Executive Secretary, John Bland, who became the new director in 1941, though they continued to work together for the remainder of that year. Two years after his retirement, Turner passed away from a heart attack. The Philip J. Turner Prize was established in his memory at the School, and is presented to the student with the highest standing in the studio course, Design and Construction 2.

Architectural career
Turner designed many types of buildings throughout his career, ranging from residences to churches, toward the end of his career. He began an independent practice in Stowmarket, Suffolk in 1900, and again in 1908 in Montreal, Quebec. Much of his architectural work between 1900 and his death in 1943 was through his own practice, however he worked in partnership with William Edward Carless from 1913 to 1915, as well as with S.H. Maw.

See also
Percy Nobbs
Stewart Henbest Capper

References

1876 births
1943 deaths
British emigrants to Canada
Alumni of the Architectural Association School of Architecture
Canadian architects
People from Stowmarket